Valukkuparai is a village in Madukkarai Taluk, Coimbatore district, Tamil Nadu, India. Valukkupparai is a Panchayat that includes the Meenachipuram, Kannamanaiganur villages and some growing real estate sites. People in this village are engaged in agriculture business and cultivation of maize, vegetables, cotton and coconuts. Most of the people are farmers mostly having cows and engaging in doing milk business.

Villages in Coimbatore district